The Tigers was a four-piece rock band from Wellington, New Zealand.

The band was formed in 1980, and secured performance slots including the Sweetwaters Music Festival while touring the North Island of New Zealand between 1980 and 1981.

The single Heart Don't Stop was memorable for the provocative image of a naked breast full size on a gloss cover. Their next single, Red Dress received live performances around New Zealand.

Band members 
 Barry Saunders (vocals/guitar)
 Wayne Mason (keyboards/vocals)
 Nick Theobald (bass Guitar/vocals)
 Mike Knapp (drums/vocals)
 Steve Lunn (guitar/saxophone)

Discography

Singles

Album

Notes

Musical groups from Wellington